Bacillus subtilis, known also as the hay bacillus or grass bacillus, is a Gram-positive, catalase-positive bacterium, found in soil and the gastrointestinal tract of ruminants, humans and marine sponges. As a member of the genus Bacillus, B. subtilis is rod-shaped, and can form a tough, protective endospore, allowing it to tolerate extreme environmental conditions. B. subtilis has historically been classified as an obligate aerobe, though evidence exists that it is a facultative anaerobe. B. subtilis is considered the best studied Gram-positive bacterium and a model organism to study bacterial chromosome replication and cell differentiation. It is one of the bacterial champions in secreted enzyme production and used on an industrial scale by biotechnology companies.

Description
Bacillus subtilis is a Gram-positive bacterium, rod-shaped and catalase-positive. It was originally named Vibrio subtilis by Christian Gottfried Ehrenberg, and renamed Bacillus subtilis by Ferdinand Cohn in 1872 (subtilis being the Latin for "fine, thin, slender"). B. subtilis cells are typically rod-shaped, and are about 4–10 micrometers (μm) long and 0.25–1.0 μm in diameter, with a cell volume of about 4.6 fL at stationary phase. 

As with other members of the genus Bacillus, it can form an endospore, to survive  extreme environmental conditions of temperature and desiccation. B. subtilis is a facultative anaerobe and had been considered as an obligate aerobe until 1998. B. subtilis is heavily flagellated, which gives it the ability to move quickly in liquids.  

B. subtilis has proven highly amenable to genetic manipulation, and has become widely adopted as a model organism for laboratory studies, especially of sporulation, which is a simplified example of cellular differentiation. In terms of popularity as a laboratory model organism, B. subtilis is often considered as the Gram-positive equivalent of Escherichia coli, an extensively studied Gram-negative bacterium.

Characteristics of Bacillus subtilis
Colony, morphological, physiological, and biochemical characteristics of Bacillus subtilis are shown in the Table below.

Note: + = Positive, – =Negative

Habitat
This species is commonly found in the upper layers of the soil and B. subtilis is thought to be a normal gut commensal in humans. A 2009 study compared the density of spores found in soil (about 106 spores per gram) to that found in human feces (about 104 spores per gram). The number of spores found in the human gut was too high to be attributed solely to consumption through food contamination. In some bee habitats, B. subtilis appears in the gut flora of honey bees. B. subtilis can also be found in marine environments.

Reproduction

Bacillus subtilis can divide symmetrically to make two daughter cells (binary fission), or asymmetrically, producing a single endospore that can remain viable for decades and is resistant to unfavourable environmental conditions such as drought, salinity, extreme pH, radiation, and solvents. The endospore is formed at times of nutritional stress and through the use of hydrolysis, allowing the organism to persist in the environment until conditions become favourable. Prior to the process of sporulation the cells might become motile by producing flagella, take up DNA from the environment, or produce antibiotics. These responses are viewed as attempts to seek out nutrients by seeking a more favourable environment, enabling the cell to make use of new beneficial genetic material or simply by killing off competition. 

Under stressful conditions, such as nutrient deprivation, B. subtilis undergoes the process of sporulation. This process has been very well studied and has served as a model organism for studying sporulation.

Sporulation

Chromosomal replication

Bacillus subtilis is a model organism used to study bacterial chromosome replication. Replication of the single circular chromosome initiates at a single locus, the origin (oriC). Replication proceeds bidirectionally and two replication forks progress in clockwise and counterclockwise directions along the chromosome. Chromosome replication is completed when the forks reach the terminus region, which is positioned opposite to the origin on the chromosome map. The terminus region contains several short DNA sequences (Ter sites) that promote replication arrest. Specific proteins mediate all the steps in DNA replication. Comparison between the proteins involved in chromosomal DNA replication in B. subtilis and in Escherichia coli reveals similarities and differences. Although the basic components promoting initiation, elongation, and termination of replication are well-conserved, some important differences can be found (such as one bacterium missing proteins essential in the other). These differences underline the diversity in the mechanisms and strategies that various bacterial species have adopted to carry out the duplication of their genomes.

Genome

Bacillus subtilis has about 4,100 genes. Of these, only 192 were shown to be indispensable; another 79 were predicted to be essential, as well. A vast majority of essential genes were categorized in relatively few domains of cell metabolism, with about half involved in information processing, one-fifth involved in the synthesis of cell envelope and the determination of cell shape and division, and one-tenth related to cell energetics.

The complete genome sequence of B. subtilis sub-strain QB928 has 4,146,839 DNA base pairs and 4,292 genes. The QB928 strain is widely used in genetic studies due to the presence of various markers [aroI(aroK)906 purE1 dal(alrA)1 trpC2].

Several noncoding RNAs have been characterized in the B. subtilis genome in 2009, including Bsr RNAs.
Microarray-based comparative genomic analyses have revealed that B. subtilis members show considerable genomic diversity.

FsrA is a small RNA found in Bacillus subtilis. It is an effector of the iron sparing response, and acts to down-regulate iron-containing proteins in times of poor iron bioavailability.

A promising fish probiotic, Bacillus subtilis strain WS1A, that possesses antimicrobial activity against Aeromonas veronii and suppressed motile Aeromonas septicemia in Labeo rohita. The de novo assembly resulted in an estimated chromosome size of 4,148,460 bp, with 4,288 open reading frames. B. subtilis strain WS1A genome contains many potential genes, such as those encoding proteins involved in the biosynthesis of riboflavin, vitamin B6, and amino acids (ilvD) and in carbon utilization (pta).

Transformation
Natural bacterial transformation involves the transfer of DNA from one bacterium to another through the surrounding medium. In B. subtilis the length of transferred DNA is greater than 1,271 kb (more than 1 million bases). The transferred DNA is likely double-stranded DNA and is often more than a third of the total chromosome length of 4,215 kb. It appears that about 7–9% of the recipient cells take up an entire chromosome.

In order for a recipient bacterium to bind, take up exogenous DNA from another bacterium of the same species and recombine it into its chromosome, it must enter a special physiological state called competence.
Competence in B. subtilis is induced toward the end of logarithmic growth, especially under conditions of amino-acid limitation. Under these stressful conditions of semistarvation, cells typically have just one copy of their chromosome and likely have increased DNA damage. To test whether transformation is an adaptive function for B. subtilis to repair its DNA damage, experiments were conducted using UV light as the damaging agent.  These experiments led to the conclusion that competence, with uptake of DNA, is specifically induced by DNA-damaging conditions, and that transformation functions as a process for recombinational repair of DNA damage.

While the natural competent state is common within laboratory B. subtilis and field isolates, some industrially relevant strains, e.g. B. subtilis (natto), are reluctant to DNA uptake due to the presence of restriction modification systems that degrade exogenous DNA. B. subtilis (natto) mutants, which are defective in a type I restriction modification system endonuclease, are able to act as recipients of conjugative plasmids in mating experiments, paving the way for further genetic engineering of this particular B. subtilis strain.

Uses

20th century

Cultures of B. subtilis were popular worldwide, before the introduction of antibiotics, as an immunostimulatory agent to aid treatment of gastrointestinal and urinary tract diseases. It was used throughout the 1950s as an alternative medicine, which upon digestion has been found to significantly stimulate broad-spectrum immune activity including activation of secretion of specific antibodies IgM, IgG and IgA and release of CpG dinucleotides inducing interferon IFN-α/IFNγ producing activity of leukocytes and cytokines important in the development of cytotoxicity towards tumor cells. It was marketed throughout America and Europe from 1946 as an immunostimulatory aid in the treatment of gut and urinary tract diseases such as Rotavirus and Shigellosis. In 1966, the U.S Army dumped bacillus subtilis onto the grates of New York City subway stations for five days in order to observe people's reactions when coated by a strange dust, due to its ability to survive, it is thought to still be present there.

The antibiotic bacitracin was first isolated from a variety of Bacillus licheniformis named "Tracy I" in 1945, then considered part of the B. subtilis species. It is still commercially manufactured by growing the variety in a container of liquid growth medium. Over time, the bacteria synthesizes bacitracin and secretes the antibiotic into the medium. The bacitracin is then extracted from the medium using chemical processes.

Since the 1960s B. subtilis has had a history as a test species in spaceflight experimentation. Its endospores can survive up to 6 years in space if coated by dust particles protecting it from solar UV rays. It has been used as an extremophile survival indicator in outer space such as Exobiology Radiation Assembly, EXOSTACK, and EXPOSE orbital missions.

Wild-type natural isolates of B. subtilis are difficult to work with compared to laboratory strains that have undergone domestication processes of mutagenesis and selection. These strains often have improved capabilities of transformation (uptake and integration of environmental DNA), growth, and loss of abilities needed "in the wild".  And, while dozens of different strains fitting this description exist, the strain designated '168' is the most widely used. Strain 168 is a tryptophan auxotroph isolated after X-ray mutagenesis of B. subtilis Marburg strain and is widely used in research due to its high transformation efficiency.

Bacillus globigii, a closely related but phylogenetically distinct species now known as Bacillus atrophaeus was used as a biowarfare simulant during Project SHAD (aka Project 112).  Subsequent genomic analysis showed that the strains used in those studies were products of deliberate enrichment for strains that exhibited abnormally high rates of sporulation.

A strain of B. subtilis formerly known as Bacillus natto is used in the commercial production of the Japanese food nattō, as well as the similar Korean food cheonggukjang.

21st century
As a model organism, B. subtilis is commonly used in laboratory studies directed at discovering the fundamental properties and characteristics of Gram-positive spore-forming bacteria.  In particular, the basic principles and mechanisms underlying formation of the durable endospore have been deduced from studies of spore formation in B. subtilis.
 Its surface-binding properties play a role in safe radionuclide waste [e.g. thorium (IV) and plutonium (IV)] disposal.
 Due to its excellent fermentation properties, with high product yields (20 to 25 gram per litre) it is used to produce various enzymes, such as amylase and proteases.
B. subtilis is used as a soil inoculant in horticulture and agriculture.
 It may provide some benefit to saffron growers by speeding corm growth and increasing stigma biomass yield.
 It is used as an "indicator organism" during gas sterilization procedures, to ensure a sterilization cycle has completed successfully. This is due to the difficulty in sterilizing endospores.
 B. subtilis has been found to act as a useful bioproduct fungicide that prevents the growth of Monilinia vaccinii-corymbosi, a.k.a. the mummy berry fungus, without interfering with pollination or fruit qualities.
Both metabolically active and non-metabolically active B. subtilis cells have been shown to reduce gold (III) to gold (I) and gold (0) when oxygen is present. This biotic reduction plays a role in gold cycling in geological systems and could potentially be used to recover solid gold from said systems.

Novel and artificial substrains
 Novel strains of B. subtilis that could use 4-fluorotryptophan (4FTrp) but not canonical tryptophan (Trp) for propagation were isolated. As Trp is only coded by a single codon, there is evidence that Trp can be displaced by 4FTrp in the genetic code. The experiments showed that the canonical genetic code can be mutable.
 Recombinant strains pBE2C1 and pBE2C1AB were used in production of polyhydroxyalkanoates (PHA), and malt waste can be used as their carbon source for lower-cost PHA production.
 It is used to produce hyaluronic acid, which is used in the joint-care sector in healthcare and cosmetics.
Monsanto has isolated a gene from B. subtilis that expresses cold shock protein B and spliced it into their drought-tolerant corn hybrid MON 87460, which was approved for sale in the US in November 2011.
A new strain has been modified to  convert nectar into honey by secreting enzymes.

Safety

In other animals
Bacillus subtilis was reviewed by the US FDA Center for Veterinary Medicine and found to present no safety concerns when used in direct-fed microbial products, so the Association of American Feed Control Officials has listed it approved for use as an animal feed ingredient under Section 36.14 "Direct-fed Microorganisms".
The Canadian Food Inspection Agency Animal Health and Production Feed Section has classified Bacillus culture dehydrated approved feed ingredients as a silage additive under Schedule IV-Part 2-Class 8.6 and assigned the International Feed Ingredient number IFN 8-19-119.
On the other hand, several feed additives containing viable spores of B. subtilis have been positively evaluated by the European Food Safety Authority, regarding their safe use for weight gaining in animal production.

In humans
Bacillus subtilis spores can survive the extreme heat generated during cooking. Some B. subtilis strains are responsible for causing ropiness or rope spoilage – a sticky, stringy consistency caused by bacterial production of long-chain polysaccharides – in spoiled bread dough and baked goods. For a long time, bread ropiness was associated uniquely with B. subtilis species by biochemical tests.  Molecular assays (randomly amplified polymorphic DNA PCR assay, denaturing gradient gel electrophoresis analysis, and sequencing of the V3 region of 16S ribosomal DNA) revealed greater Bacillus species variety in ropy breads, which all seems to have a positive amylase activity and high heat resistance.

B. subtilis CU1 (2 × 109 spores per day) was evaluated in a 16-week study (10 days administration of probiotic, followed by 18 days wash-out period per each month; repeated same procedure for total 4 months) to healthy subjects. B. subtilis CU1 was found to be safe and well tolerated in the subjects without any side effects.

Bacillus subtilis and substances derived from it have been evaluated by different authoritative bodies for their safe and beneficial use in food. In the United States, an opinion letter issued in the early 1960s by the Food and Drug Administration (FDA) designated some substances derived from microorganisms as generally recognized as safe (GRAS), including carbohydrase and protease enzymes from B. subtilis. The opinions were predicated on the use of nonpathogenic and nontoxicogenic strains of the respective organisms and on the use of current good manufacturing practices. The FDA stated that the enzymes derived from the B. subtilis strain were in common use in food prior to January 1, 1958, and that nontoxigenic and nonpathogenic strains of B. subtilis are widely available and have been safely used in a variety of food applications. This includes consumption of Japanese fermented soy bean, in the form of Natto, which is commonly consumed in Japan, and contains as many as 108 viable cells per gram. The fermented beans are recognized for their contribution to a healthy gut flora and vitamin K2 intake; during this long history of widespread use, natto has not been implicated in adverse events potentially attributable to the presence of B. subtilis. The natto product and the B. subtilis natto as its principal component are FOSHU (Foods for Specified Health Use) approved by the Japanese Ministry of Health, Labour, and Welfare as effective for preservation of health.

Bacillus subtilis has been granted "Qualified Presumption of Safety" status by the European Food Safety Authority.

See also
 Adenylosuccinate lyase deficiency
 Extremophile
 Guthrie test
 YlbH leader

References

External links
 
 SubtiWiki "up-to-date information for all genes of Bacillus subtilis"
 Bacillus subtilis Final Risk Assessment on EPA.gov. Archived from the original on 2015-09-09.
 Bacillus subtilis genome browser
 Type strain of Bacillus subtilis at BacDive - the Bacterial Diversity Metadatabase

subtilis
Bacteria described in 1872
Extremophiles